Viktoriia Maksimivna Onopriienko (born 18 October 2003) is a Ukrainian individual rhythmic gymnast. She competed at the 2020 Tokyo Olympics, finishing tenth in the all-around final. She is the 2020 Grand Prix Final all-around champion and the 2022 World Games ribbon bronze medalist. She is the 2021 Ukrainian all-around champion. At the junior level, she is the 2018 European team silver medalist.

Early life 
Onopriienko was born on 18 October 2003 in Kyiv. Her parents are both dental technicians. She began rhythmic gymnastics at age four, and she also tried figure skating for three months.

Career

Junior
Onopriienko competed at the 2018 European Championships, winning team silver alongside Khrystyna Pohranychna and the Ukrainian senior group.

Senior

2019 
Onopriienko participated in her first World Cup in Pesaro, where she finished in ninth place all-around and qualified for the ball, ribbon, and clubs finals, finishing seventh in ball and ribbon, and fourth in clubs. Then at the Sofia World Cup, she finished fourteenth in the all-around. She again finished fourteenth in the all-around at the Baku World Cup and qualified to ball and clubs finals, finishing sixth and fourth, respectively. She competed at the 2019 European Championships in Baku, where she, Vlada Nikolchenko, and the junior group placed fifth in team competition. She did not advance into the all-around or apparatus finals. Then at the Minsk World Challenge Cup, she finished fourteenth in the all-around and seventh in the clubs final. She was scheduled to compete in two events in the qualification round of the World Championships, but she was taken out at the last minute.

2020 
In September, Onopriienko competed at Deriugina Grand Prix Final in Kyiv, where she won all-around gold ahead of Belarusian gymnasts Alina Harnasko and Anastasiia Salos. In the event finals, she won the gold medal in the hoop and the silver medal in the ribbon behind Harnasko. She then tied for the silver medal in all-around with Yeva Meleshchuk, behind Vlada Nikolchenko, at the Ukrainian Championships in Uzhhorod.

2021 
Onopriienko competed at the Sofia World Cup, finishing sixth in the all-around and ball and fifth in clubs. At the Tashkent World Cup, she ranked thirteenth all-around and sixth in the ribbon final. Then at the Baku World Cup she was fifteenth in the all-around and eighth in the ball final. At the Ukrainian Championships, she won her first national all-around title.. She finished fourteenth in the all-around at the Pesaro World Cup.

Onopriienko competed at her first senior European Championships in Varna, Bulgaria. She and her Ukrainian teammates Khrystyna Pohranychna and Vlada Nikolchenko and the senior group placed fifth in the team competition. Individually, she qualified for the all-around final where she finished eleventh. She qualified for the hoop and clubs event finals where she finished eighth and seventh respectively. She then participated in the Tel Aviv Grand Prix, where she finished sixth place all-around, eighth in the hoop final, and fourth in the ball and clubs finals.

Onopriienko and Khrystyna Pohranychna were selected as the individual rhythmic gymnasts representing Ukraine at the postponed 2020 Olympic Games in Tokyo. Onopriienko was the youngest individual rhythmic gymnast competing. She qualified for the all-around final in ninth place, and her compatriot Pohranychna qualified as well. In the all-around final, she finished tenth. After the Olympics, she competed at the Marbella Grand Prix Final, where she placed second all-around behind Russian gymnast Lala Kramarenko. In the apparatus finals, she won the silver medal in ribbon, the bronze in hoop and clubs, and finished in seventh place in ball. She then competed at the World Championships in Kitakyushu, Japan. She qualified for the hoop and finals where she finished eighth and the ball final where she finished seventh. She then competed in the all-around final and finished in fifth place, and Ukraine placed fourth in the team competition.

2022 
Onopriienko had to leave Ukraine and live and train in Italy in March due to the Russian invasion of Ukraine. In April, she won her first FIG World Cup medal at the Sofia World Cup- a bronze in the ribbon final. Then in June, she won her first World Cup title by beating Sofia Raffaeli in the ribbon final at the Pesaro World Cup. She then competed at the European Championships where she finished eighth in the all-around and fifth in the hoop final.

Onopriienko was selected to represent Ukraine at the 2022 World Games alongside Polina Karika. She qualified for the hoop final where she finished eighth and won the bronze medal in the ribbon final. This marked the first time a Ukrainian rhythmic gymnast won a medal at the World Games since 2013. She then competed at the World Championships in Sofia, Bulgaria. She finished fourth in the all-around and ball finals and sixth in the clubs final, and the Ukrainian team also finished fourth.

Personal life 
Onopriienko enjoys cooking and would like to open her own restaurant in the future.

Onopriienko's older brother Serhiy died in June 2022 fighting as a member of the Armed Forces of Ukraine during the Russian invasion of Ukraine.

Routine music information

Detailed Olympic results

References

External links 
 
 

Living people
2003 births
Gymnasts from Kyiv
Ukrainian rhythmic gymnasts
Olympic gymnasts of Ukraine
Gymnasts at the 2020 Summer Olympics
21st-century Ukrainian women
Competitors at the 2022 World Games
World Games bronze medalists